This article describes the qualifying for the 2013–14 EHF Women's Champions League.

Format
A total of 17 teams will take part in the qualification tournaments. The clubs will be drawn into four groups of four and play a semifinal and the final. The winner of the qualification groups advance to the group stage. Matches will be played at 14–15 September 2013. The draw took place on 27 June, at 14:00 local time at Vienna, Austria.

Seedings

Playoff
The winner advanced to the qualification phase 2.

First leg

Second leg

SERCODAK Dalfsen won 68–55 on aggregate.

Qualification tournament 1
An organizer was announced later. Byåsen HE was chosen to organize the tournament.

Semifinals

Third place game

Final

Qualification tournament 2
Initially, LK Zug had the right to organise the tournament, but the club didn't enjoy this right, therefore this tournament was organized by FTC-Rail Cargo Hungaria.

Semifinals

Third place game

Final

Qualification tournament 3
HCM Baia Mare organized the tournament.

Semifinals

Third place game

Final

Qualification tournament 4
PDO Salerno organized the tournament.

Semifinals

Third place game

Final

References

External links
Official website

2013–14 Women's EHF Champions League